The valley of Lurín is a district of the Lima Province in Peru. Known for its archaeological temple of Pachacamac, the Pachacamac Island or "La Ballena", countryside areas, villages, fincas, rural restaurants, nightlife and beaches, it is one of the three valleys of the city of Lima.

Boundaries
It borders on the north with the districts of Pachacamac, Villa María del Triunfo, and Villa el Salvador, to the east also with the Pachacamac District, to the south with Punta Hermosa, and to the west with the Pacific Ocean.

General information
Historically, the district was the location of the temple complex of Pachacamac.

The district was created on January 2, 1857, and since then it has been an agricultural district as it is located in the center of the Lurín River valley. It has a few beaches which receive tourists during the summer months (December–March) principally from the city of Lima which it is gradually being incorporated into.

This southern suburb of Lima benefits from industrial activities along the Panamericana highway like Unique -Yanbal factory  and an industrial park  "Las Praderas" where important companies like Owens Illinois operate.

The district is also home to the National Museum of Peru, which opened in 2021.

See also
 Administrative divisions of Peru
Cono Sur
Lima Metropolitan Area

References

External links 

Districts of Lima